This is a list of seasons completed by the Dallas Desperados. The Desperados were a professional arena football franchise of the Arena Football League (AFL), based in Dallas, Texas. The team was established in 2002. They qualified for the playoffs five times, winning three division championships, but never appeared in the ArenaBowl. In the  season, Dallas went 15–1, a league record for wins, but were upset in the Divisional Round of the playoffs by sixth seeded Columbus, a team that had won only seven games during the regular season. Prior to the  season, the AFL announced that it had suspended operations indefinitely and canceled the 2009 season. The Desperados played their home games at American Airlines Center.

References
General
 

Specific

Arena Football League seasons by team
Dallas Desperados seasons
Dallas-related lists
Texas sports-related lists